Felix Gschossmann (born 3 October 1996) is an Austrian professional footballer who plays as a goalkeeper for Austrian Football Second League club Blau-Weiß Linz.

References

External links 

Living people
1996 births
Austrian footballers
2. Liga (Austria) players
SKU Amstetten players
FC Blau-Weiß Linz players
Association football goalkeepers
People from Amstetten, Lower Austria
Footballers from Lower Austria